Camden Haven High School (abbreviated as CHHS) is a government-funded co-educational comprehensive secondary day school, located in , a village near , in the Mid North Coast region of New South Wales, Australia.

Established in 2000, the school catered for approximately 1,100 students in 2018, from Year 7 to Year 12, of whom twelve percent identified as Indigenous Australians and two percent were from a language background other than English. The school is operated by the NSW Department of Education; the principal is Margaret Hutchinson.

Overview 

A united school culture has been developed by establishing across school management, curriculum and special programs working teams. The school was formed from an amalgamation of the high school section of Kendall Central School and the distance education centre located, at the time, in Port Macquarie. Kendall Central School became Kendall Public School.

Face-to-face students are drawn from the local Camden Haven region. Students enrolled in the Distance Education School are located in the region from the Central Coast to Coffs Harbour and inland to the New England Highway, (Armidale and Tamworth) as well as from Lord Howe and Norfolk Islands. Face-to-face students are able to enrol in the Distance Education School when face-to-face class numbers in a specific subject are too low. e.g. languages.

CHHS has a reputation in achieving significant results, particularly in the performing arts and sport.

See also

 List of government schools in New South Wales
 List of schools in Northern Rivers and Mid North Coast
 Education in Australia

References

External links

e-Learning student interface (until 2018)
e-Learning student interface (Canvas 2018 onwards)
 NSW Schools website

Public high schools in New South Wales
2000 establishments in Australia
Educational institutions established in 2000
Mid North Coast